Adams Streeter (December 31, 1735 – September 14, 1786) was an American clergyman the first minister of the Universalist congregations in Oxford and Milford, Massachusetts.

Born in Framingham, Massachusetts, the son of Stephen and Catherine (Adams) Streeter, with whom he removed at an early age to Douglass, he was the first pastor of the First Universalist Church in Boston, where later his relation served, Russell Streeter, editor of the Christian Intelligencer from 1822, and minister of the First Universalist Society in Portland, Maine. Adams' brother Zebulon was also an early Universalist pastor. Another relation was Sebastian Streeter, also a Universalist minister.

References

1735 births
1786 deaths
Clergy of the Universalist Church of America
18th-century Christian universalists
Place of death missing
18th-century American clergy